Larry Gibson may refer to:
 Larry Gibson (environmentalist) (1946–2012), anti-mining environmentalist from West Virginia
 Larry S. Gibson (born 1942), law professor, lawyer, political organizer, and historian
 Larry M. Gibson (born 1947), American businessman

Larry Gibson was a lead campaign manager for the Ellen Johnson Sirleaf political campaign in 2005.